Kurt Christer Abrahamsson (born 8 April 1947), also known as Christer Abris, is a Swedish former ice hockey goaltender and coach.

Abrahamsson played for Leksands IF in two stints (1965–1974 and 1977–1982) winning the Swedish championship in 1969, 1973 and 1974), and for the World Hockey Association's New England Whalers from 1974 to 1977. He also played for the Swedish national team in the IIHF World Championships five times (helping win the silver medal in 1973 and 1981, and the bronze medal in 1972 and 1974), and in the 1972 Winter Olympics. He was awarded Guldpucken in 1973–74 as Swedish Player of the Year.

His twin brother Thommy Abrahamsson also played ice hockey, as a defenceman.

References

External links
 

1947 births
Living people
Ice hockey players at the 1972 Winter Olympics
Leksands IF players
Olympic ice hockey players of Sweden
New England Whalers players
Sportspeople from Umeå
Swedish ice hockey goaltenders
Swedish twins
Twin sportspeople